Roseum  may refer to:

 Calyptridium roseum, a synonym for Cistanthe rosea, a flowering plant species
 Catasetum roseum, a synonym for Catasetum lemosii, an orchid species
 Dendrochilum roseum, a synonym for Dendrobium crepidatum, an orchid species
 Dipodium roseum, an orchid species
 Epilobium roseum, a plant species in the genus Epilobium
 Eriogonum roseum, the wand buckwheat, a wild buckwheat species
 Fusarium roseum, a synonym for Gibberella zeae, a plant pathogen which causes fusarium head blight, a devastating disease on wheat and barley
 Gliocladium roseum, a synonym for Clonostachys rosea f. rosea, a species of fungus in the family Bionectriaceae
 Laeticorticium roseum, a fungus that is a plant pathogen that decays the wood of peach and nectarine trees
 Micrommata roseum, a synonym for Micrommata virescens, a spider of the huntsman spider family, Sparassidae, with a palearctic distribution
 Solanum roseum, a plant species endemic to Bolivia
 Stephopoma roseum, a sea snail species
 Scindalma roseum, a synonym for Fomitopsis rosea
 Stylidium roseum, a synonym for Stylidium tenellum, a plant species
 Trichonema roseum, a synonym for Romulea rosea, a herbaceous perennial species
 Trichothecium roseum, a plant pathogen species
 Xanthosoma roseum, an ornamental plant in the genus Xanthosoma
 Xenophyllum roseum, a species of flowering plant found only in Ecuador

See also
 rosea (disambiguation)
 roseus (disambiguation)